Pal Judy is an album by Judy Nylon and Crucial, released in 1982 by record label On-U Sound.

Reception 

Trouser Press called it "a moody, adeptly created and performed record", while AllMusic called it a "dark, moody exercise in postmodern pop".

Track listing
All tracks composed by Judy Nylon; except where indicated
"Information Rain"
"Dateline Miami" (Nylon, Chris Joyce, Sean Oliver)
"Live in a Lift"
"Jailhouse Rock" (Jerry Leiber, Mike Stoller)
"Trial By Fire" (Nylon, Patti Palladin)
"Sleepless Nights"
"Others"
"The Dice"
"Room Without a View"

Personnel
Judy Nylon - vocals
Coco Charnel (Pascal Bourdariat), Kendall Ernest - guitar
George Oban, Sean "Hogg" Oliver - bass guitar
Nick Plytas - keyboards; vocals on "Jailhouse Rock"
Chris Joyce, Dan Sheals - drums
Eskimo Fox (Charles Kelly) - percussion on "The Dice"
John Waddington - guitar on "Room Without a View"
Technical
John Walker, Bob Z - engineer

References

External links 

 

1982 albums
Albums produced by Adrian Sherwood
On-U Sound Records albums